Don Bacon (born 1963) is an American politician.

Don Bacon may also refer to:

 Don Bacon (microbiologist) (1926–2020), New Zealand professor of microbiology
 Don Bacon (baseball) (born 1935), minor league baseball player and manager
 Don Bacon, the main antagonist of the mobile game Angry Birds Evolution